Vasily Osipovich Smyslov (1881–1943) was a chess master, and the father of Vasily Vasilievich Smyslov, World Chess Champion from 1957–58.

Born in Astrakhan, in the Volga Delta, he studied at the Saint Petersburg State Institute of Technology, and became an economic engineer. He was a strong chess player, and once defeated Alexander Alekhine, at St. Petersburg 1912 (Winter tournament). He finished 5th at St. Petersburg 1903 (N.A. Panchenko won) and tied for 4–6th at Moscow 1929.

References

1881 births
1943 deaths
Chess players from the Russian Empire
Date of birth missing
Date of death missing
Saint Petersburg State Institute of Technology alumni
Soviet chess players